Manizan may refer to:
 Manizan, Hamadan
 Manizan, Markazi